Khunsorkh or Khoon Sorkh or Khun-e Sorkh or Khun Sorkh or Khun Surkh may refer to:
 Khunsorkh, Hormozgan
 Khun Sorkh, Kerman
 Khun Sorkh, Jiroft, Kerman Province
 Khunsorkh, Lorestan